Liuyuan Subdistrict is a former subdistrict of Gusu District, Suzhou, Jiangsu, China. The subdistrict was abolished on March 24, 2017 when it was merged into Huqiu Subdistrict.

Administrative divisions 
In 2016, before its abolition, Liuyuan Subdistrict administered the following 11 residential communities:

 Liuyuan Community
 Xiyuan Community
 Hutian Community
 Ren'an Community
 Boqian Road Community
 Huqiu Road Community
 Xinzhuang New Village Community
 Shuofangzhuang Community
 Guanjing Community
 Laiyun Community
 Jiaye Sunshine City Community

See also
Huqiu Subdistrict
List of township-level divisions of Suzhou

References

Gusu District

Former township-level divisions of Suzhou